Aliabad (also Romanized as ‘Alīābād) is a village in Shurakat-e Jonubi Rural District, Ilkhchi District, Osku County, East Azerbaijan Province, Iran. At then 2006 census, its population was 235, in 63 families.

References 

Populated places in Osku County